Fish Venkat is a film actor who works in the Telugu film industry. He was born in Hyderabad, Telangana, India. He is also a comedy actor and he strongly uses a Telangana dialect that is reminiscent to fishermen, thus earning him the name "Fish" Venkat.

Filmography

References

External links
 

Indian male film actors
Telugu male actors
Telugu comedians
Male actors in Telugu cinema
Year of birth missing (living people)
Living people
Indian male comedians
Male actors from Hyderabad, India
21st-century Indian male actors